The following lists events that happened during 1946 in South Africa.

Incumbents
 Monarch: King George VI.
 Governor-General: Gideon Brand van Zyl (starting 1 January).
 Prime Minister: Jan Christiaan Smuts.
 Chief Justice: Ernest Frederick Watermeyer.

Events
January
 1 – Gideon Brand van Zyl is appointed the 7th Governor-General of the Union of South Africa.

March
 12 – The South African Indian Congress delegation is received by the Viceroy, Lord Wavell, in Delhi, India, and submits a petition drafted in consultation with Mohandas Gandhi.
 12 – The Indian Representative Act is repealed.
 12 – India terminates the trade agreement with South Africa.
 15 – The Asiatic Land Tenure Act, the "Ghetto Act", is amended to state that Indians may only live where Indians had resided in non-proclaimed areas.
 31 – 6,000 Indians march in Durban in protest to the Asiatic Land Tenure Act.

April
 16 – The Eureka Diamond, the first diamond discovered in South Africa, is sold in London for £5,700.

June
 11 – India recalls its High Commissioner from South Africa.
 22 – During a prayer meeting in New Delhi, India, Mahatma Gandhi calls for South Africa to stop hooliganism by whites.
 23 – A group of white men attack and assault a group of Indian Passive Resisters.

July
 8 – Indian protests against government legislation lead to the arrest of hundreds of Indians.

Births
 8 January – Whitey Basson, businessman and billionaire, former CEO of Shoprite
 18 January – Jakes Gerwel, academic and politician. (d. 2012)
 19 July – Lucas Malan, Afrikaans poet, author and academic
 15 September – Mike Procter, cricketer
 5 December – Sarel van der Merwe, former rally and racing driver
 18 December – Steve Biko, anti-apartheid activist. (d. 1977)

Deaths
 13 April – William Henry Bell, musician, composer and first director of the South African College of Music. (b. 1873)

Railways

Railway lines opened
 1 June – Transvaal: Ogies to Vandyksdrif, .

Locomotives
 The South African Railways places the first of fifty Class GEA 4-8-2+2-8-4 Garratt articulated steam locomotives in service.

References

History of South Africa